James Howell Howard (April 8, 1913 – March 18, 1995) was a general in the United States Air Force and the only fighter pilot in the European Theater of Operations in World War II  to receive the Medal of Honor — the United States military's highest decoration. Howard was an ace in two operational theaters during World War II, with six kills with the Flying Tigers of the American Volunteer Group (AVG) in the Pacific and six kills over Europe with the United States Air Force. CBS commentator Andy Rooney, then a wartime reporter for Stars and Stripes, called Howard's exploits "the greatest fighter pilot story of World War II". In later life, Howard was a successful businessman, author, and airport director.

Early life
Born on April 8, 1913, in Canton, China, where his American parents lived at the time while his ophthalmologist father was teaching eye surgery there, Howard returned with his family to St. Louis, Missouri, in 1927. After graduating from John Burroughs School in St. Louis, he earned a Bachelor of Arts degree from Pomona College in Claremont, California, in 1937, intending to follow his father into medicine. Shortly before graduation, however, Howard decided that the life of a Naval Aviator was more appealing than six years of medical school and internship, and he entered the United States Navy as a naval aviation cadet.

United States Navy service
Howard began his flight training in January 1938 at Naval Air Station Pensacola, earning his wings a year later. In 1939, he was assigned as a U.S. Navy pilot aboard the aircraft carrier , based at Pearl Harbor, Hawaii. In June 1941, he left the Navy to become a P-40 fighter pilot with the American Volunteer Group (AVG), the famous Flying Tigers, in Burma. He flew 56 missions and was credited with shooting down six Japanese airplanes.

United States Army Air Forces

After the Flying Tigers were disbanded on July 4, 1942, Howard returned to the U.S. and was commissioned a captain in the Army Air Forces. In 1943, he was promoted to the rank of major and given command of the 356th Fighter Squadron in the 354th Fighter Group, based in the United Kingdom.

On January 11, 1944, Howard flew his P-51 unaccompanied into some 30 Luftwaffe fighters that were attacking a formation of American B-17 Flying Fortress bombers over Oschersleben, Germany. For more than a half-hour, Howard defended the heavy bombers of the 401st Bomb Group against the swarm of Luftwaffe fighters, repeatedly attacking the enemy and shooting down as many as six. Even after Howard's P-51 ran out of ammunition, he continued to dive on enemy airplanes. The leader of the bomber formation later reported, "For sheer determination and guts, it was the greatest exhibition I've ever seen. It was a case of one lone American against what seemed to be the entire Luftwaffe. He was all over the wing, across and around it. They can't give that boy a big enough award."

The following week, the Army Air Forces held a press conference in London at which Major Howard described the attack to reporters, including the BBC, the Associated Press, CBS reporter Walter Cronkite, and Andy Rooney, then a reporter for Stars and Stripes. The story was a media sensation, prompting articles such as "Mustang Whip" in the Saturday Evening Post, "Fighting at 425 Miles Per Hour" in Popular Science, and "One Man Air Force" in True magazine. "An attack by a single fighter on four or five times his own number wasn't uncommon," wrote a fellow World War II fighter pilot in his postwar memoirs of Howard's performance, "but a deliberate attack by a single fighter against thirty-plus enemy fighters without tactical advantage of height or surprise is rare almost to the point of extinction." The following month, Howard was promoted to lieutenant colonel and in June 1944, he was presented the Medal of Honor by General Carl Spaatz for his January 11 valor. That same month, Howard helped direct fighter plane cover for the Allies' Normandy landings on D-Day.

Air Force
In January 1945, Howard was promoted to colonel and assigned as base commander of Pinellas Army Airfield (now St. Petersburg-Clearwater International Airport) in Florida. With the establishment of the United States Air Force as a separate service in 1947, then-Colonel Howard was transferred to the Air Force. In 1948, he was promoted to the rank of brigadier general in the U.S. Air Force Reserve, commanding the Air Force Reserve's 96th Bombardment Group.

Later years
 As a civilian after the war, Howard was Director of Aeronautics for St. Louis, Missouri, managing Lambert Field while maintaining his military status as a brigadier general in the United States Air Force Reserve. He later founded Howard Research, a systems engineering business, which he eventually sold to Control Data Corporation. He married Mary Balles in 1948 in a military wedding ceremony. In later years, they were divorced and Howard then married Florence Buteau.

In the 1970s, Howard retired to Belleair Bluffs in Pinellas County, Florida. In 1991, he wrote an autobiography, Roar of the Tiger, chiefly devoted to his wartime experiences. On January 11, 1994, the 50th anniversary of the Oschlersleben attack, the Board of County Commissioners in Pinellas County proclaimed "General Howard Day" and presented him with a plaque. A permanent exhibit honoring General Howard was also unveiled in the terminal building of the county's St. Petersburg-Clearwater International Airport. Another exhibit paying tribute to Howard was subsequently dedicated at his high school alma mater, John Burroughs School in St. Louis.

On January 27, 1995, Howard made his last public appearance when he was guest of honor at the annual banquet of the West Central Florida Council of the Boy Scouts of America, in Clearwater, Florida. He died six weeks later at the nearby Bay Pines Veterans Hospital, survived by two sisters. He is buried at Arlington National Cemetery

Howard Avenue in the Market Common District of Myrtle Beach, South Carolina, is named in tribute to Howard, who was a commander of the relocated 354th Fighter-Day Group at nearby Myrtle Beach Air Force Base. There is a memorial marker with photos and an inscription in Market Common Valor Memorial Garden at the intersection of Hackler Street and Howard Avenue: .

Summary of aircraft destroyed

All information on enemy aircraft damaged and destroyed is from Stars and Bars.

Military awards
Howard received the following awards:

Medal of Honor citation
The citation accompanying the Medal of Honor awarded to Lieutenant Colonel James H. Howard on 5 June 1944, by Lieutenant General Carl Spaatz reads:

See also

 List of Medal of Honor recipients
 List of Medal of Honor recipients for World War II

References

Further reading
 Freeman, Roger A., Airfields of the ninth, then and now, After the Battle

External links

1913 births
1995 deaths
People from Guangzhou
Burials at Arlington National Cemetery
United States Army Air Forces Medal of Honor recipients
World War II recipients of the Medal of Honor
Recipients of the Distinguished Flying Cross (United States)
Recipients of the Air Medal
Recipients of the Order of the Sacred Tripod
Flying Tigers
United States Army Air Forces officers
United States Air Force generals
United States Army Air Forces pilots of World War II
American World War II flying aces
Pomona College alumni
United States Naval Aviators
American expatriates in China